

Standings

Men's Competition

Women's Competition

References
Complete 1997 Mediterranean Games Standings

Sports at the 1997 Mediterranean Games
1997 in volleyball
Volleyball at the Mediterranean Games
Mediterranean Games